The Positive Kashmir Football Championship is an annual football tournament organized by The Positive Kashmir and Jammu and Kashmir Sports Council. The first edition was held in September and October 2021. J&K Bank defeated J&K SPDC XI by 5–2 in the finals.
The second edition was kicked off in October to November 2022. The defending champion J&K Bank defeated FC One with 1–0.

Results

References

Football cup competitions in India
Football in Jammu and Kashmir